Robin Haase was the defending champion, but decided to participate in the Winston-Salem Open instead.

Adrian Ungur won the tournament after defeating qualifier and sensation of this tournament Peter Gojowczyk 4–6, 7–6(7–4), 6–2 in the final.

Seeds

Draw

Finals

Top half

Bottom half

References
 Main Draw
 Qualifying Draw

Antonio Savoldi-Marco Co - Trofeo Dimmidisi - Singles
Antonio Savoldi–Marco Cò – Trofeo Dimmidisì